Döwletli is a town in Hojambaz District in Lebap Province, Turkmenistan. Prior to 9 November 2022 it was the seat of Döwletli District, which was abolished by parliamentary decree on that date.  Until 2010 it was named Jeýhun, the ancient name of the Amu Darya.  Döwletli annexed the adjacent village of Bataş in July 2016.

References

Lebap Region